Charaxes lucyae is a butterfly in the family Nymphalidae. It is found in Tanzania. 

Very close to Charaxes eudoxus but with more dentate wing margins and
longer tails; there are also minor differences in the genitalia 

The habitat consists of sub-montane and montane forests.

Subspecies
Charaxes lucyae lucyae (north-eastern Tanzania)
Charaxes lucyae gabriellae Turlin & Chovet, 1987 (north-eastern Tanzania)
Charaxes lucyae mwanihanae Kielland, 1982 (eastern Tanzania)

Related species
Historical attempts to assemble a cluster of presumably related species into a "Charaxes jasius Group" have not been wholly convincing. More recent taxonomic revision, corroborated by phylogenetic research, allow a more rational grouping congruent with cladistic relationships. Within a well-populated clade of 27 related species sharing a common ancestor approximately 16 mya during the Miocene, 26 are now considered together as The jasius Group.  One of the two lineages within this clade forms a robust monophyletic group of seven species sharing a common ancestor approximately 2-3 mya, i.e. during the Pliocene, and are considered as the jasius subgroup. The second lineage leads to 19 other species within the Jasius group, which are split in to three well-populated subgroups of closely related species.

The jasius Group (26 Species):

Clade 1: jasius subgroup (7 species)

Clade 2: contains the well-populated three additional subgroups (19 species) of the jasius Group: called the brutus, pollux, and eudoxus subgroups.

the eudoxus subgroup (11 species):
Charaxes eudoxus
Charaxes lucyae
Charaxes richelmanni
Charaxes musakensis
Charaxes biokensis[stat.rev.2005]
Charaxes ducarmei
Charaxes druceanus
Charaxes tectonis
Charaxes phraortes
Charaxes andranodorus
Charaxes andrefana[stat.rev.2025]

Further exploration of the phylogenetic relationships amongst existing Charaxes taxa is required to improve clarity.

References

van Someren, V.G.L., 1975 Revisional notes on African Charaxes, Palla and Euxanthe (Lepidoptera: Nymphalidae). Part X. Bulletin of the British Museum of Natural History (Entomology) 32 (3):65-136.

External links
Charaxes lucyae lucyae images at Consortium for the Barcode of Life

Butterflies described in 1975
lucyae
Endemic fauna of Tanzania
Butterflies of Africa